Disney's Aladdin is a 1993 platform game developed and published by Capcom for the Super Nintendo Entertainment System, based on the 1992 animated Disney film of the same name. Disney's Aladdin is a 2D side-scrolling video game in which the player controls Aladdin and his monkey Abu. It was designed by Shinji Mikami.

The game was released in November 1993, the same month that another game with the same title was released by Virgin Games for Sega Genesis. The two games vary in some respects; in the Virgin game, Aladdin wields a scimitar, which is not the case in the Capcom game. The Capcom game was ported to Game Boy Advance (GBA) in Japan on August 1, 2003, in Europe on March 19, 2004, and in North America on September 28, 2004.

Gameplay

Disney's Aladdin is a side-scrolling platform game in which the player controls the eponymous main character through several stages taking place throughout the city of Agrabah. Within each stage, Aladdin defeats foes by jumping on them or disorienting them by throwing apples while avoiding dangerous obstacles. Gems can be collected to gain extra lives and points, and 10 red gems located within each stage will substantially increase the player's score. Most stages contain a treasure chest holding a scarab that flies about for a few seconds. If the player collects it before it disappears they will access a bonus stage in which they spin a wheel that allows Genie to grant them extra lives and other special bonuses. Aladdin has a health meter of hearts, starting with 3, which will deplete each time he is hit. These can be increased through pickups or through the bonus stages as well. Aladdin is given a certain number of lives, which are lost if he runs out of health or falls off the bottom of the screen. The game ends when the player runs out of lives, but the player can continue playing as long as they have credits.

The escape from the Cave of Wonders and the carpet ride with Princess Jasmine are both stages in which the player rides the Magic Carpet through self-scrolling stages. While in the Cave of Wonders the player must traverse up and down to avoid dangerous obstacles while outrunning waves of lava, the ride with Jasmine is a free-flying bonus stage (between stages 5 and 6) in which the player can collect gems; the bonus stage ends when the melody to "A Whole New World" ends. Stages 1, 6 and 7 have a boss to defeat, stage 7 being the final stage; stages 2, 3, 4 and 5 require reaching the end to complete.

Reception

In the United Kingdom, Aladdin was the top-selling SNES game in December 1993.

Electronic Gaming Monthly four reviewers scored the Super NES version 8, 8, 9 and 8 out of 10, adding up to 33 out of 40 (average 8.25 out of 10). They commented that the graphics, animation, music and gameplay are all outstanding. GameFans four reviewers scored it 90%, 89%, 87% and 90%. Pedro Hernandez of Nintendo World Report gave the game a positive review, saying that "Capcom truly did something great with this Super NES game". A ScrewAttack reviewer also gave the game a positive review, saying that it was one of the best SNES games. Aladdin proved to be a commercial success, selling approximately 1.8 million copies worldwide, becoming Capcom's highest-selling game for the Super Nintendo Entertainment System after Street Fighter II and its various versions.

Shinji Mikami, the game's designer, said that if he had not made the SNES game, he "would probably buy" the Virgin game because it has a sword and better animation.

The GBA port received mixed reviews. Avi Fryman of GameSpy called the port of Disney's Aladdin "the most monumentally disappointing" of all the ports from SNES to GBA.

Accolades
IGN placed the SNES version 60th on their Top 100 SNES Games of All Time commenting that the game "faithfully [translates] the film's over-the-top magic into magical 16-bit form". In 2018, Complex rated the game 42nd in its "The Best Super Nintendo Games of All Time". In 1995, Total! ranked Aladdin 47th on its Top 100 SNES Games. They praised the game's animation and gameplay.

Re-release
The SNES version of the game was included alongside The Jungle Book, The Lion King, and the Virgin Games version of Aladdin as part of Disney Classic Games Collection: Aladdin, The Lion King, and The Jungle Book, an updated release of Disney Classic Games: Aladdin and The Lion King, which was set for release for the Nintendo Switch, PlayStation 4, Windows, and Xbox One on November 9, 2021 before being delayed until November 23. Those who purchased the original Disney Classic Games release are also able to purchase the game and The Jungle Book as downloadable content.

References

1993 video games
Disney games by Capcom
Disney video games
Aladdin (franchise) video games
Game Boy Advance games
Side-scrolling platform games
Single-player video games
Super Nintendo Entertainment System games
Video games designed by Shinji Mikami
Video games developed in Japan
Video games set in the Middle East
Capcom games